Bal Sundari Mandir, also known as Chaiti Mandir, is a temple located in Kashipur. During Navratras in March a grand fair is held here every year. The temple is renowned for its religious significance and is a popular destination for devotees seeking spiritual enlightenment drawing thousands of pilgrims and devotees from far-flung areas.

The temple derives its name from the nearby Drona Sagar and the old Ujjain fort of Kashipur town. Visitors to the temple can pay their respects to Ujjaini Devi and immerse themselves in a spiritual experience.

References

Religious buildings and structures in Uttarakhand
Kashipur, Uttarakhand